Gork, the Teenage Dragon is the debut novel by American writer Gabe Hudson. The novel takes place at WarWings Military Academy for Draconum, an elite high school for young dragons. About this novel, Dave Eggers wrote, “No good human won’t love this dragon named Gork.”

The publisher Alfred A. Knopf states: “A love story, a fantasy, and a coming-of-age story, Gork the Teenage Dragon is a wildly comic, beautifully imagined, and deeply heartfelt debut novel that shows us just how human a dragon can be.”

References

External links 

2017 American novels
Alfred A. Knopf books
Fictional dragons
Science fantasy novels
2017 debut novels